Whangateau is a small town on the east coast of the North Island of New Zealand.  It is situated in Rodney District, part of the Auckland Region, and is on a peninsula stretching out into the Hauraki Gulf, north of Auckland.  Whangateau is on the northern shore of Whangateau Harbour which is fed by the Omaha River and separated from Omaha Bay by the Maungatawhiri sandspit. The settlement is in two parts of 20 to 30 houses each.  The main settlement includes a large public reserve with sports fields and a campground. There is also a public hall which hosts music events and a flax weaving group. The smaller settlement is Tram Car Bay, named for two tram cars which were used as holiday homes.  Whangateau is situated between the rural settlement of Matakana and the fishing village of Leigh. A tsunami siren is located in the town.

History
The wider Omaha area around Whangateau Harbour was a favourite source of fish and birds for Māori tribes for centuries before the arrival of Europeans. (Omaha means 'Place of Plenty').  There were many disputes over control and the only tribe in residence at the time of the first European settlement was Ngāti Wai, whose chief Te Kiri gave the Leigh marae its name.

In 1858 the Pakiri block was purchased from Maori by the Crown and in 1892 the area around Whangateau was surveyed into 30 or  blocks for settlement by immigrants from England and Scotland.  The public reserve, which is on the waterfront, was surveyed and plans for a school and hall were formulated.  Smaller house sites were established close to the reserve.  The school was later closed but a hall was built around 1898, and remains today as the focal point of the settlement. Until the 1980s there was a store located on the main road, which was featured in a 1985 Tip Top Trumpet television commercial starring Kiwi model Rachel Hunter.

A cemetery established on a high promontory overlooking the harbour has the remains of many early settlers and is still used for burials.  A camp ground was established on the reserve and was run by the local community until 1997 when control was taken over by the Rodney District Council. Horse races used to be held on the mudflats of the harbour at low-tide. The community also developed sports fields on the reserve and it remains a popular site for various sports fostered by the Rodney Rams Sports Club. The clubhouse itself was destroyed by fire in 2014.
Whangateau was a centre for trade during the 1800s as there were no roads and all traffic was by sea.  The recently restored Big Omaha wharf was used to berth coastal shipping taking apples and kauri gum (resin) to the Auckland markets.  It was adjacent to two important ship building facilities owned by the Darrochs and Meiklejohns where many of the early coastal vessels were built.

Demographics
Whangateau is part of the larger Cape Rodney statistical area.

Whangateau had a population of 126 at the 2018 New Zealand census, a decrease of 3 people (−2.3%) since the 2013 census, and an increase of 9 people (7.7%) since the 2006 census. There were 45 households, comprising 63 males and 63 females, giving a sex ratio of 1.0 males per female. The median age was 52.3 years (compared with 37.4 years nationally), with 15 people (11.9%) aged under 15 years, 15 (11.9%) aged 15 to 29, 66 (52.4%) aged 30 to 64, and 27 (21.4%) aged 65 or older.

Ethnicities were 88.1% European/Pākehā and 26.2% Māori. People may identify with more than one ethnicity.

Although some people chose not to answer the census's question about religious affiliation, 64.3% had no religion and 26.2% were Christian.

Of those at least 15 years old, 24 (21.6%) people had a bachelor's or higher degree, and 15 (13.5%) people had no formal qualifications. The median income was $28,900, compared with $31,800 nationally. 18 people (16.2%) earned over $70,000 compared to 17.2% nationally. The employment status of those at least 15 was that 51 (45.9%) people were employed full-time, 18 (16.2%) were part-time, and 3 (2.7%) were unemployed.

References

Populated places in the Auckland Region
Rodney Local Board Area
Matakana Coast